The Mimar Sinan Fine Arts University (or MSGSÜ) is a Turkish public university dedicated to higher education in the fine arts. It is located in the Fındıklı neighbourhood of Beyoğlu, Istanbul, Turkey.

Founded in 1882 by Osman Hamdi Bey, the institution imitated the traditional European Beaux-Arts model and was the first Western-style art academy of its kind in the Middle East.

The Mimar Sinan Fine Arts High Schools in Istanbul and Ankara have no relation with the  Mimar Sinan Fine Arts University.

History

On January 1, 1882, he renowned Turkish painter, art historian, archaeologist, and museum curator, Osman Hamdi Bey established the School of Fine Arts (Sanayi-i Nefise Mekteb-i Âlisi, formally Mekteb-i Sanayi-i Nefise-i Şâhâne or Sanayi-i Nefise Mektebi) here.  When it opened on March 2, 1883, with eight instructors and 20 students, it was Turkey's first educational institution for the fine arts and architecture.

In 1914, the school became co-educational. In 1928 it was converted from a school to an academy - the first in Turkey - and its name was changed to the State Academy of the Fine Arts (Devlet Güzel Sanatlar Akademisi). In 1969, it was renamed  as the Istanbul State Academy of Fine Arts (İstanbul Devlet Güzel Sanatlar Akademisi, or İDGSA), and gained administrative autonomy according to Law No. 1172 on Fine Arts Academies in Turkey.

On July 20, 1982, its status was changed again, and the academy became Mimar Sinan University"(Mimar Sinan Üniversitesi) in memory of the great Ottoman architect Mimar Sinan. Finally, in December 2003, the administration of the university changed its name to the Mimar Sinan Fine Arts University.

Since 1982 the institution has been providing four-year educational programmes.

Building

The building that houses what is now the Mimar Sinan Fine Arts University started life in 1856 as the twin palaces of Münire Sultan and Cemile Sultan, the daughters of Sultan Abdülmecid. They were used for meetings of the Chamber of Deputies of the Ottoman Empire between 1910 and 1920.

Basic Design Education Division 
Following the Academy Reform and a student occupation in 1968, Basic Design Education (Temel Sanat Eğitimi) was incorporated into the curriculum in 1969. The Basic Design Education Division was critical of the master-apprentice model and aimed to blur the distinction between handicrafts and fine arts. The co-founders of this division included Altan Gürman, Ercümend Kalmık, Ali Teoman Germaner, Erkal Güngören, Özer Kabaş, and Nuri Temizsoylu, who wanted to create a Bauhaus-inspired model to enable consistency and continuity in the education that first-year students received. This model aimed at encouraging students to explore, question and analyse different techniques, tools, and materials related to arts and design.

Following the 1980 coup d'état in Turkey, the administration and autonomy of universities changed, and Basic Design Education was removed from the curriculum in 1982.

Academic units

 Faculty of natural sciences and literature (archeology, pedagogy, physics, statistics, mathematics, history of art, sociology, history, Turkish philology and literature)
 Faculty of fine arts (photography, traditional Turkish handicrafts, graphic design, sculpture, painting, stage design and stage clothes, ceramics art and glass art, cinema and TV, textile design and fashion design, bookbinding, tilework restoration, calligraphy, rug and old textile design), Restoration and Conservation of art works (Painting and Sculpture)
 Faculty of Architecture (industrial design, interior architecture, architecture, urban planning and regional planning)
 Istanbul State Conservatory (full-time and part-time) / (music, musicology, performing arts)
 Vocational School (textile design, architectural restoration)
 Institute of Natural Sciences
 Institute of Social Sciences
 Institute of Fine Arts
 School of Informatics

Associated institutions
 Tophane Kasrı
 Istanbul Museum of Painting and Sculpture
 Tophane-i Amire Cultural Center

Notable faculty 

 Osman Hamdi Bey, painter, art historian and archaeologist
 Yervant Osgan, sculptor
 İbrahim Çallı, painter
 Filiz Ali, pianist and musicologist
 Rudolf Belling, German sculptor
 Nuri Bilge Ceylan, film director, screenwriter and photographer
 Adnan Coker, painter
 Bedri Rahmi Eyüboğlu, painter and poet
 Nazmi Ziya Güran, painter
 Bruno Taut, German architect
 Alexander Vallaury, French architect
 Robert Vorhoelzer, German architect and city planner
 Ali Teoman Germaner, sculptor
 Hande Erçel, Turkish actress and model
 Neşe Aybey, miniaturist
 Hüseyin Tahirzade Behzat, miniaturist

Notable alumni

Actors and models 

 Okan Bayülgen, actor and television personality
 Hande Erçel, actress and model
 Nazlı Deniz Kuruoğlu, ballet dancer and Miss Turkey 1982
Tuba Büyüküstün, actress and model
 Halit Ergenç, actor
Nejat İşler, actor
Sarp Akkaya, actor

Artists 

 Maide Arel, Armenian-Turkish painter, graduated in 1935
 Akbar Behkalam, German-Iranian painter and sculptor
 Sinem Banna, Turkish-American sculptor
 Adnan Coker, painter
Nevin Çokay, painter
 Nazmi Ziya Güran, painter
Nur Koçak, artist
Maya Kulenovic, Canadian painter (student from 1992 to 1995)
 Elif Naci, painter
Erinç Seymen, Turkish artist
 Sevil Soyer, painter and interdisciplinary artist

Musicians 
 Burak Bilgili, opera singer
Yonca Evcimik, pop singer

Other 

 Kutluğ Ataman, film director
 Pınar Selek, sociologist and human rights activist
 Galip Tekin, comic book artist

See also
 National Palaces Painting Museum
 List of universities in Turkey

References

External links
 University's official website 
 Mimar Sinan 
 Mimar Sinan Students Portal 

 
Educational institutions established in 1882
Educational institutions established in 1982
Bosphorus
Beyoğlu
1982 establishments in Turkey
1882 establishments in the Ottoman Empire